The Museum of Sacred, Magical and Medicinal Plants was a privately owned museum located in Cusco, Peru. The Museum was established in 2011 as a non-profit organization. The mission of the Museum was to contribute to the conservation of the vegetal wealth of the Amazon rainforest and the Andes of South America, in particular those plants that contribute to human well-being, and the associated indigenous traditional knowledge on the medicinal, ritual and shamanic use of plant resources.

According to Fodors, "It's a great opportunity to get a more thorough understanding about plants that were, and still are, a vital part of the indigenous cultures of Peru." TripAdvisor says "is a museum to learn about all the Andean plants and their use."

The museum closed in June 2014.

Exhibitions

Permanent exhibits
The Museum had several permanent exhibitions in 9 exhibition halls, 5 of which are dedicated to the following plants:
 Erythroxylum coca
 Nicotiana rustica
 Echinopsis pachanoi
 Anadenanthera
 Banisteriopsis caapi and Psychotria viridis

In addition, there was one hall dedicated to the medicinal plants of the Amazon, another to the medicinal plants of the Andes and one on Biopiracy. In the patios of the museum, medicinal plants were also exhibited.

Other points of interest
The Museum Shop had a wide diversity of natural products not easily found elsewhere, as well as indigenous craft arts, books, and magazines.
The Museum Restaurant offered a variety of national and international dishes, and a variety of herbal teas.

See also
 List of museums in Peru

References

External links
 Official Website

Museums in Cusco
Anthropology museums
Ethnographic museums in South America
Peruvian culture
Tourist attractions in Cusco Region